Nicholas Stanley Firestone (born March 31, 1966) is an American former race car driver.

A great-grandson of Harvey Samuel Firestone (founder of the Firestone Tire and Rubber Company) and Idabelle Smith, grandson of Roger (1912–1970) and son of Peter, he graduated from Princeton University in 1989.

Starting in Karts he moved to junior formula cars then the British Formula 2 Championship. He competed in 42 Indy Lights races from 1993 to 1996. His best finish was second at Nazareth Speedway and The Milwaukee Mile in 1993. He attempted to qualify for the 1999 Indianapolis 500 for McCormack Motorsports but failed to make the field. He has now moved back to racing Karts. He has two children, Peter and Annabel.

Career Results

American Open-Wheel racing results
(key) (Races in bold indicate pole position, races in italics indicate fastest race lap)

USAC FF2000 Championship results

Indy Lights results

IndyCar Series

References

 Driver Database profile
 Firestone Kart site

1966 births
Living people
Princeton University alumni
American people of Austrian descent
Firestone family
Indy Lights drivers
British Formula 3000 Championship drivers
EFDA Nations Cup drivers
Racing drivers from Phoenix, Arizona
U.S. F2000 National Championship drivers